Gavrilovskaya is a rural locality (a selo) in Pechnikovskoye Rural Settlement of Kargopolsky District, Arkhangelsk Oblast, Russia. The population was 71 as of 2010.

Geography 
Gavrilovskaya is located 36 km west of Kargopol (the district's administrative centre) by road. Dudkinskaya is the nearest rural locality.

References 

Rural localities in Kargopolsky District